Malik Wasif Mazhar Raan is a Pakistani politician who had been a member of the Provincial Assembly of Punjab from April 2019 till January 2023.

Political career
Wasif Mazhar Raan contested by-election on 31 March 2019 from constituency PP-218 (Multan-VIII) of Provincial Assembly of Punjab on the ticket of Pakistan Tehreek-e-Insaf. He won the election by the majority of 7,502 votes over the runner up Malik Muhammad Arshad Raan of Pakistan Peoples Party. He garnered 46,988 votes while Arshad Raan received 39,486 votes.

References

Living people
Pakistan Tehreek-e-Insaf MPAs (Punjab)
Punjab MPAs 2018–2023
Year of birth missing (living people)